Oaris is a modular high-speed train platform developed by the Spanish manufacturer CAF.

Technical details

Oaris is a non-articulated electric multiple unit with distributed traction, enabling 4-car, 6-car and 8-car configurations. Each car have one powered bogie, with electric motors on both wheelsets, and one unpowered bogie. Power equipment is designed to enable adaptation to all four of the main overhead electrification systems in use across Europe.

Oaris bodyshells was manufactured from aluminium.

History

May 2010. After fours years of development in a project supported by CDTI, CAF announced the Oaris platform with the unveiling of a full-scale mock-up in May 2010 in the International Rail Forum 2010 at Valencia.
 September 2010. A prototype starts to be assembled by CAF. It has 4 cars and is designed for 216 seats. Renfe has reserved the class 105 for the prototype.
January 14, 2011. CAF announces that the  prototype is finished and will undergo dynamic tests in early 2011.
 December 2011. Four-car prototype undergoes trials at up to 352 km/h on the Madrid to Sevilla route.
 Spring 2013. Prototype gets homologation by Brazilian Railindustry Association, which will allow CAF to offer trains for the proposed high-speed rail connection between Rio de Janeiro and São Paulo.
 2013. Test runs for homologation in Spain. In October 2013  company sources said the approval process of Oaris is in the final stages and within months is ready for operation.
 March 2015: The Norwegian airport train operator Flytoget ordered eight 4-car trainsets (maximum speed 250 km/h) to supplement their 16 trains fleet on their Drammen-Oslo-Gardermoen Airport service and will be allowed to run at a maximum speed of 210 km/h on the line, starting from June 2021. They will be known as Class 78.
 June 2019: Belonging to the five train manufacturers selected to tender for High Speed 2 rolling stock CAF presented their Oaris trains as passenger trains for HS2.
 June 2021: The trainsets delivered to Flytoget were withdrawn from service after 19 days of operation due to discovery of cracks in the chassis.

See also
 Bombardier Zefiro
 Alstom AGV
 Siemens Velaro
 List of high-speed trains

References

External links
 CAF Oaris trains 
 CAF unveils Oaris high speed train concept (Railway Gazette International)

Experimental and prototype high-speed trains
CAF rolling stock
Passenger trains running at least at 200 km/h in commercial operations
3000 V DC multiple units
15 kV AC multiple units
25 kV AC multiple units